Sir Henry D'Anvers (1731 – 13 August 1758) was the 4th baronet of the D'Anvers baronets, of Culworth.

Education
D'Anvers of Culworth was educated at John Roysse's Free School in Abingdon, (now Abingdon School) and later Lincoln College, Oxford.

He was a Steward of the OA Club in 1753.

Peerage
He succeeded Sir John Danvers, 3rd Baronet, to the title in 1744 and is commemorated with a memorial on the north wall of the chancel at Culworth Church. On his death the title went to his brother Sir Michael D'Anvers, 5th Baronet.

See also
 List of Old Abingdonians

References

1731 births
1758 deaths
People educated at Abingdon School
Baronets in the Baronetage of England
Alumni of Lincoln College, Oxford